Adam Richard Busch (born July 6, 1978) is an American actor, film director and singer best known starring as Warren Mears on the television series Buffy the Vampire Slayer.

Career
Busch was born in East Meadow, New York. His first film role came in the movie Léon: The Professional. Early roles include Noah Allen from Nickelodeon's the Mystery Files of Shelby Woo, and an episode of Law & Order. He also had a small part as a nerdy AV geek in the bank-robbing cheerleader movie Sugar & Spice.

Busch appeared on Fox Network's  brief series The Jury in Summer 2004, which ran for ten episodes, and has been seen in a character role on House. In 2006 he portrayed the Orthodox Jewish rap artist, Sholom Glickstein, in the Paul Weitz film, "American Dreamz". He had a recurring role in the Kelsey Grammer situation comedy, Back to You. He made a guest appearance on Terminator: The Sarah Connor Chronicles. He also had a guest spot on Are You Scared 2. He is also the singer in indie rock band Common Rotation. His dream role would be to portray former pop star Huey Lewis in a biopic. He also played Neal in the TBS show Men at Work.

Personal life
In March 2009, Busch was dating Buffy co-star Amber Benson, who played Tara Maclay. The two have since broken up but have remained close friends.

Busch was raised Jewish.

Filmography

References

External links

1978 births
Living people
American male film actors
American male television actors
People from East Meadow, New York
Male actors from New York (state)
20th-century American male actors
21st-century American male actors
American film directors
American rock singers
21st-century American singers